Herbert III may refer to:

 Herbert III of Omois (910–980/985)
 Herbert III, Count of Meaux (circa 950 – 995) 
 Herbert III, Count of Vermandois (953–1015)